The Arnold AR-5 is an experimental single seat, low-wing sport monoplane with fixed conventional undercarriage, designed and built by Mike Arnold.

Development and design 
Originally conceived by Mike Arnold as a personal sport airplane with excellent performance and good handling qualities. The design outperformed initial performance estimates for its relatively low power output, exceeding 200mph with only 65hp. Constructed of fiberglass-epoxy matrix composite material utilizing the "moldless method" popularized by Burt Rutan. Careful attention to aerodynamic detail resulted in noteworthy laminar flow drag reduction, as documented by aerodynamicists Alex Strojnik and Bruce Carmichael.

Legacy 
In 1992, the AR-5 flown by Mike Arnold set the FAI C1a Class World Speed Record of 343,08 km/h over a 3.0km course. Mike wrote several articles about his design methodology for various magazines. The sole existing example resides at the Hiller Aviation Museum, San Carlos, CA.

Specifications

References 

Racing aircraft